The  is a Kofun period burial mound located in the Hirose neighborhood of what is now the city of Kumagaya, Saitama Prefecture in the Kantō region of Japan. It was designated a National Historic Site of Japan in 1956.

Overview
The Miyazuka Kofun is located on a river terrace in the middle reaches of the Arakawa River, and is part of the Hirose tumulus cluster, which has many densely packed small-scale tumuli. It is a rare example of a  tumulus, which has a square base on top of which is a domed tumulus. It was built in the latter half of the 7th century, or towards the final stages of the Kofun period. The mound was originally covered in fukiishi. It has never been excavated, so the structure of the burial chamber or presence of any grave goods is unknown. Although the base was originally square, it has been partially cut away by local farmers.

The site is located about 15 minutes on foot from Hirose-Yachō-no-Mori Station on the Chichibu Railway Chichibu Main Line.

Upper domed portion 10 meter diameter x 2.5 meter high
Lower rectangular base 17 meters wide on east x 24 meters wide on west x 2 meters high

See also
List of Historic Sites of Japan (Saitama)

References

External links
Kumagaya City official site 

Kofun
History of Saitama Prefecture
Kumagaya
Archaeological sites in Japan
Historic Sites of Japan